The 2006 Rink Hockey European Championship was the 47th edition of the Rink Hockey European Championship, the biennial European rink hockey competition. The competition took place in Monza, Italy in the Pallazo dello Sport, also known as Pala Candy, from July 16 to July 22. Spain won the competition for the 13th time, beating Switzerland 2–0 in the final. Portugal took the 3rd place after beating 5-4 the hosts, Italy. This competition was part of the Euro Roller Games 2006, that also featured the European Championships of roller skating and artistic roller skating.

Format

There are 3 groups of 3 teams in Phase I. Each team plays each other within the group and all teams but the worse 3rd place of all groups will go into the quarter-finals.

Then, the losers and the team who didn't go to the quarter-finals will play a Poule for the 5th to 9th position. If any team played each other before this Poule, they won't be playing again: the results from Phase I will count.

The winners in the quarter-finals keep playing each other in a knockout system until the winner is found. There is also a game for 3rd and 4th place for the losers at the Semi-finals.

Every game lasts for 40 minutes, divided into 2 parts of 20, instead of the usual 50 minutes in some leagues.

Phase I

Group A

Group B

Group C

Knockout Phase

Bracket

Quarterfinals

Semifinals

3rd Place Game

Final

5th to 9th Poule

The games between teams that played against each other in Phase I are not repeated. The result from the Phase I game counted instead. This was the case for two matches, from Group A England vs. France and from Group B Austria vs. Germany:

The other matches were played as follows:

Final table

Goal scorers

12 goals
 Francesco Dolce

9 goals
 James Taylor

8 goals
 Ramon Bassols
 Ricardo Barreiros

7 goals
 Henry Guirec
 Vítor Hugo
 Reinaldo Ventura
 Marc Gual
 Pedro Gil

6 goals
 Sérgio Silva
 Jorge Silva

5 goals
 Mirco Bertolucci

4 goals
 David Huber
 Brendan Barker
 Baptiste Lucas
 Dominik Brandt
 Davide Motaran
 Josep Maria Ordeig

3 goals
 Sylvain Brochard
 Sebastien Furstenberger
 Remy Hourcq
 Alessandro Bertolucci
 Eduard Fernández
 Lluís Teixidó
 Florian Brentini
 Michael Muller

2 goals
 Alex Martin
 Marc Montardit
 Ivan Villaro
 Thomas Haller
 Igor Tarassioux
 Felix Bender
 Mattia Cocco
 Valter Neves
 Tiago Rafael
 Pedro Moreira
 Sergi Panadero
 Josep Maria Roca

1 goal
 Guillem Sarle
 Juan Sebastian
 Gunter Faul
 Manuel Parfant
 Thomas Simcic
 Michael Schwendinger
 Andrew Gregory
 Karl Smith
 Julien Huvelin
 Andre Kussolek
 Marc Schinkowski
 Leonardo Squeo
 Alberto Peripolli
 Jordi Bargalló
 Matthieu Brentini
 Federico Garcia-Mendez
 Stefan Rubi
 Gael Jimenez

Squads

Andorra

Austria

England

France

Germany

Italy

Portugal

Spain

Switzerland

External links
 Information on the 2006 European Championship

CERH European Roller Hockey Championship
2006 in roller hockey
2006 in Italian sport
International roller hockey competitions hosted by Italy